Etfal Hospital Clock Tower, or Children's  Hospital Clock Tower, is a clock tower situated in the garden of the Hamidiye Etfal Hospital (now Şişli Etfal Hospital) in the Şişli district of İstanbul, Turkey at the European side of Bosphorus.  It was ordered by the Ottoman sultan Abdülhamid II (reigned 1876–1909) and constructed by the architect Mehmet Şükrü Bey.

On the front face, the tughra of Sultan Abdülhamid II is put on.

See also
 List of columns and towers in Istanbul
 Dolmabahçe Clock Tower
 Yıldız Clock Tower
 İzmir Clock Tower
 İzmit Clock Tower

External links

 Municipality official website

Ottoman clock towers
Buildings and structures in Istanbul
Clock towers in Turkey
Ottoman architecture in Istanbul
Şişli
Towers completed in 1907